The 1983–84 Kentucky Wildcats men's basketball team represented University of Kentucky and went to the 1984 Final Four. The head coach was Joe B. Hall. The team was a member of the Southeast Conference and played their home games at Rupp Arena.  Because the Wildcats played the regional final on their home court, the following season the NCAA enacted a rule not allowing any school to play in a tournament game on its home court.  However, the ruling did not take effect until after the 1986–87 season.

Roster

Schedule

|-
!colspan=12 style=| Regular Season

|-
!colspan=12 style=| SEC Tournament

|-
!colspan=12 style=| NCAA Tournament

Statistics
C Melvin Turpin (6-11, Sr) 15.2 ppg
F Kenny Walker (6-8, So) 12.4 ppg
F Sam Bowie (7-1, Sr) 10.5 ppg
G Jim Master (6-5, Sr) 9.6 ppg
F Winston Bennett (6-7, Fr) 6.5 ppg

Awards and honors

Team players drafted into the NBA

References

Kentucky
Kentucky Wildcats men's basketball seasons
NCAA Division I men's basketball tournament Final Four seasons
Kentucky
Kentucky Wildcats
Kentucky Wildcats